The Egyptian Mathematical Leather Roll (EMLR) is a 10 × 17 in (25 × 43 cm) leather roll purchased by Alexander Henry Rhind in 1858. It was sent to the British Museum in 1864, along with the Rhind Mathematical Papyrus, but it was not chemically softened and unrolled until 1927 (Scott, Hall 1927).

The writing consists of Middle Kingdom hieratic characters written right to left. Scholars date the EMLR to the 17th century BCE.

Mathematical content
This leather roll is an aid for computing Egyptian fractions. It contains 26 sums of unit fractions which equal another unit fraction. The sums appear in two columns, and are followed by two more columns which contain exactly the same sums.

Of the 26 sums listed, ten are Eye of Horus numbers: 1/2, 1/4 (twice), 1/8 (thrice), 1/16 (twice), 1/32, 1/64 converted from Egyptian fractions. There are seven other sums having even denominators converted from Egyptian fractions: 1/6 (listed twice–but wrong once), 1/10, 1/12, 1/14, 1/20 and 1/30. By way of example, the three 1/8 conversions followed one or two scaling factors as alternatives:

1. 1/8 x 3/3 = 3/24 = (2 + 1)/24 = 1/12 + 1/24

2. 1/8 x 5/5 = 5/40 = (4 + 1)/40 = 1/10 + 1/40

3. 1/8 x 25/25 = 25/200 = (8 + 17)/200 = 1/25 + (17/200 x 6/6) = 1/25 + 102/1200 = 1/25 + (80 + 16 + 6)/1200 = 1/25 + 1/15 + 1/75 + 1/200

Finally, there were nine sums, having odd denominators, converted from Egyptian fractions: 2/3, 1/3 (twice), 1/5, 1/7, 1/9, 1/11, 1/13 and 1/15.

The British Museum examiners found no introduction or description to how or why the equivalent unit fraction series were computed. Equivalent unit fraction series are associated with fractions 1/3, 1/4, 1/8 and 1/16. There was a trivial error associated with the final 1/15 unit fraction series. The 1/15 series was listed as equal to 1/6. Another serious error was associated with 1/13, an issue that the examiners of 1927 did not attempt to resolve.

Modern analysis
The original mathematical texts never explain where the procedures and formulas came from. This holds true for the EMLR as well. Scholars have attempted to deduce what techniques the ancient Egyptians may have used to construct both the unit fraction tables of the EMLR and the 2/n tables known from the Rhind Mathematical Papyrus and the Lahun Mathematical Papyri. Both types of tables were used to aid in computations dealing with fractions, and for the conversion of measuring units.

It has been noted that there are groups of unit fraction decompositions in the EMLR which are very similar. For instance lines 5 and 6 easily combine into the equation 1/3 + 1/6 = 1/2. It is easy to derive lines 11, 13, 24, 20, 21, 19, 23, 22, 25 and 26 by dividing this equation by 3, 4, 5, 6, 7, 8, 10, 15, 16 and 32 respectively.

Some of the problems would lend themselves to a solution via an algorithm which involves multiplying both the numerator and the denominator by the same term and then further reducing the resulting equation:
 
This method leads to a solution for the fraction 1/8 as appears in the EMLR when using N=25 (using modern mathematical notation):

Modern conclusions

The EMLR has been considered a student scribe test document since 1927, the year that the text was unrolled at the British Museum. The scribe practiced conversions of rational numbers 1/p and 1/pq to alternative unit fraction series. Reading available Middle Kingdom math records, RMP 2/n table being one, modern students of Egyptian arithmetic may see that trained scribes improved conversions of 2/n and n/p to concise unit fraction series by applying algorithmic and non-algorithmic methods.

Chronology
The following chronology shows several milestones that marked the recent progress toward reporting a clearer understanding of the EMLR's contents, related to the RMP 2/n table.

 1895 – Hultsch suggested that all RMP 2/p series were coded by aliquot parts.
 1927 – Glanville concluded that EMLR arithmetic was purely additive.
 1929 – Vogel reported the EMLR to be more important (than the RMP), though it contains only 25 unit fraction series.
 1950 – Bruins independently confirms Hultsch's RMP 2/p analysis (Bruins 1950)
 1972 – Gillings found solutions to an easier RMP problem, the 2/pq series (Gillings 1972: 95–96).
 1982 – Knorr identifies RMP unit fractions 2/35, 2/91 and 2/95 as exceptions to the 2/pq problem.
 2002 – Gardner identifies five abstract EMLR patterns.
 2018 – Dorce explains the pattern of RMP 2/p.

See also
Egyptian mathematical texts:
 Akhmim Wooden Tablet
 Berlin Papyrus 6619
 Lahun Mathematical Papyri
 Moscow Mathematical Papyrus
 Reisner Papyrus

Other:
Liber Abaci
Sylvia Couchoud

References

Further reading
Brown, Kevin S. The Akhmin Papyrus 1995 – Egyptian Unit Fractions 1995
Bruckheimer, Maxim and Y. Salomon. “Some Comments on R. J. Gillings’ Analysis of the 2/n Table in the Rhind Papyrus.” Historia Mathematica 4 Berlin (1977): 445–452.
Bruins, Evert M.  “Platon et la table égyptienne 2/n”. Janus 46, Amsterdam, (1957): 253–263.
Bruins, Evert M. “Egyptian Arithmetic.” Janus 68, Amsterdam, (1981): 33–52.
Bruins, Evert M. “Reducible and Trivial Decompositions Concerning Egyptian Arithmetics”. Janus 68, Amsterdam, (1981): 281–297.
Daressy, Georges. “Akhmim Wood Tablets”, Le Caire Imprimerie de l’Institut Francais d’Archeologie Orientale, 1901, 95–96.
Dorce, Carlos. "The Exact Computation of the Decompositions of the Recto Table of the Rhind Mathematical Papyrus", History Research, Volume 6, Issue 2, December 2018, 33–49.
Gardner, Milo. "Mathematical Roll of Egypt", Encyclopaedia of the History of Science, Technology, and Medicine in Non-Western Cultures, Springer, Nov. 2005.
Gillings, Richard J. “The Egyptian Mathematical Leather Roll”. Australian Journal of Science 24 (1962): 339–344, Mathematics in the Time of the Pharaohs. Cambridge, Mass.: MIT Press, 1972. New York: Dover, reprint 1982.
Gillings, Richard J. “The Recto of the Rhind Mathematical Papyrus: How Did the Ancient Egyptian Scribe Prepare It ?” Archive for History of Exact Sciences 12 (1974), 291–298.
Gillings, Richard J. “The Recto of the RMP and the EMLR”, Historia Mathematica, Toronto 6 (1979), 442–447.
Gillings, Richard J. “The Egyptian Mathematical Leather Role–Line 8. How Did the Scribe Do it?” (Historia Mathematica 1981), 456–457.
Gunn, Battiscombe George. Review of ”The Rhind Mathematical Papyrus” by T. E. Peet. The Journal of Egyptian Archaeology 12 London, (1926): 123–137.
Annette Imhausen. “Egyptian Mathematical Texts and their Contexts”, Science in Context, vol 16, Cambridge (UK), (2003): 367–389.
Legon, John A.R. “A Kahun Mathematical Fragment”. Discussions in Egyptology, 24 Oxford, (1992).
Lüneburg, H. “Zerlgung von Bruchen in Stammbruche” Leonardi Pisani Liber Abbaci oder Lesevergnügen eines Mathematikers, Wissenschaftsverlag, Mannheim, 1993. 81–85.
Rees, C. S. “Egyptian Fractions”, Mathematical Chronicle 10, Auckland, (1981): 13–33.
Roero, C. S. “Egyptian mathematics” Companion Encyclopedia of the History and Philosophy of the Mathematical Sciences" I. Grattan-Guinness (ed), London, (1994): 30–45.
Scott, A. and Hall, H.R., “Laboratory Notes: Egyptian Mathematical Leather Roll of the Seventeenth Century BC”, British Museum Quarterly, Vol 2, London, (1927): 56.
Sylvester, J. J. “On a Point in the Theory of Vulgar Fractions”: American Journal of Mathematics, 3 Baltimore (1880): 332–335, 388–389.

External links
EMLR
EMLR
EMLR

Egyptian fractions
Ancient Egyptian texts
Mathematics manuscripts
Ancient Egyptian objects in the British Museum
Egyptian mathematics